"97 Bonnie & Clyde" is a song by the American rapper Eminem. The song appears on the Slim Shady EP (as "Just the Two of Us") and The Slim Shady LP. Eminem recorded a prequel for The Marshall Mathers LP, "Kim". The song was covered by Tori Amos on her 2001 album of gender-swapped covers, Strange Little Girls.
In the song, Eminem (or his alter ego Slim Shady) talks to his daughter whilst taking her to the pier to throw his wife, Kim, in the sea. He speaks to his daughter Hailie in a baby like fashion (ex: c'mon Hai-Hai we going to the beach.
Grab a couple of toys and let Dada strap you into the car seat.) but still has a dark undertone.

Background
The song has Eminem disposing of the corpse of his ex-wife, Kim Mathers, in the lake with his then-infant daughter Hailie. The sounds played at the beginning of the song, including the jingling of keys and the slamming of a car door, imply that Eminem put Kim's body in the trunk of his car. These are the same sounds played at the end of the song "Kim" by Eminem. In "Kim", the lines immediately before the sounds are heard. Eminem got the idea to write this song at a time when Kim was stopping him from seeing his daughter. Eminem asked Marilyn Manson to guest appear on the song, but the singer declined because he felt that the song was "too misogynistic".

Critical response
AllMusic highlighted and praised the song: "notorious track where he imagines killing his wife and then disposing of the body with his baby daughter in tow" and critic noted that this song is connected with Eminem's life struggles. Steve "Flash" Juon called the remix bad and he continued, "[It is] lifeless and oddly out of place among an album full of mostly dope cuts." Rob Sheffield wrote, "[T]he wife-killing jokes of "97 Bonnie and Clyde" aren't any funnier than Garth Brooks'." Entertainment Weekly gave a positive opinion: "In the album's funniest slice of black humor, a smart-ass parody of Will Smith's unctuous "Just the Two of Us" called "97 Bonnie & Clyde," Eminem and his baby daughter take a pleasant drive to a lake — into which he tosses the dead body of the child's mother. Sending up the gooey sentiments and pop melody of the Smith hit, Eminem raps: "Mama said she wants to show you how far she can float/And don't worry about that little boo-boo on her throat."

See also

 Bonnie and Clyde (film), 1967
 "'03 Bonnie & Clyde", 2002 song by Jay-Z featuring Beyoncé

References

1998 singles
Eminem songs
Songs about Bonnie and Clyde
Tori Amos songs
Horrorcore songs
Obscenity controversies in music
Songs written by Eminem
1997 songs
Songs about parenthood
Interscope Records singles
Uxoricide in fiction
Songs about domestic violence
Songs written by Jeff Bass